Rudaki (Tajik: Рӯдакӣ/رودکی}) is a jamoat in western Tajikistan. It is part of the city of Panjakent in the Sughd Region. The jamoat has a total population of 15,039 (2015). It consists of 13 villages, including Kuloli (the seat), Artuch and Yakkakhona.

The village, once a part of Persia, is the birthplace of the poet Rudaki.

Notes

References

Populated places in Sughd Region
Jamoats of Tajikistan